The Multi-function Unmanned Helicopter "Black Widow" is a type of unmanned aerial vehicle developed in Georgia by STC Delta. The system is intended for military as well as for civil purposes. Spheres of usage are border policing, weapon aiming, signals intelligence, disaster monitoring and other roles. Armament of the UAV helicopter is 2 X M-134 minigun and 8 X unguided rocket missiles or 2 X M-134 minigun and 2 laser guided AT rockets. The vehicle is based on the Exec 162F. It was presented to public on the Independence Day of Georgia in 2015.

Specifications

External sources 
Multi-function Unmanned Helicopter - Official web site of DELTA

References 

Military equipment of Georgia (country)
Unmanned military aircraft of Georgia
Vehicles introduced in 2015
Unmanned helicopters